Gianluca Prestianni Gross (born 31 January 2006) is an Argentine professional footballer who plays as a winger for Vélez Sarsfield.

Club career
Prestianni made his professional debut for Vélez Sarsfield in the Copa Libertadores on 24 May 2022 in match against Estudiantes.

International career
Prestianni has played internationally for Argentina at under-17 level.

Career statistics

References

External links
 

2006 births
Living people
People from Buenos Aires
Argentine footballers
Association football wingers
Club Atlético Vélez Sarsfield footballers